Interstate 291 (I-291) is a short auxiliary Interstate Highway in the state of Connecticut that starts at I-91 at its junction with Route 218 in Windsor and ends at I-84 and I-384 in Manchester. It serves as a northeastern bypass of Hartford.

I-291 is also known as the Vietnam Veterans Memorial Highway for its entire length.

Route description
I-291 begins at I-91 in Windsor at an interchange that also provides access to and from Route 218.  Heading southeast, I-291 has a partial interchange with Route 159, then crosses the Connecticut River on the Bissell Bridge. Originally constructed in 1957, the Bissell Bridge charged a toll until 1988 when the bridge was reconstructed. It has an interchange with US Route 5 (US 5) in South Windsor at its junction with Route 30, and ends at I-84 in Manchester in a complex interchange that also provides access to I-384. At the west end, stub ramps continue about  past I-91 to provide access to Route 218.

History
The current I-291 is only the northeastern arc of what was originally planned as a three-quarter beltway around Hartford. From Windsor, I-291 would have continued to cross I-84 again in Farmington, and end at I-91 in Rocky Hill. While the remainder of I-291 was canceled amid environmental concerns, those two interchanges were built as part of I-84 and I-91 construction and stood unused for over 20 years as ramp stubs. Half of the stack interchange at I-84 was eventually placed in service when Route 9 was extended to run along a portion of the I-291 right of way south of I-84 in 1992. The I-91 ramp was demolished in 1999 during expansion of I-91. The northernmost  of the Route 9 expressway follows the original path of the southwest segment of I-291 from I-84. Route 9 currently serves as the southwest quadrant around Hartford leaving only the northwest section of I-291 unbuilt.

Route 218 is a four-lane divided arterial route serving what would have been the northwest quadrant of the I-291 beltway. When the interchange with I-91 was completed in the early 1990s, a pair of ramp stubs connecting I-291 to Route 218 were built to the west of I-91 in anticipation that the northwest leg of I-291 might eventually be built. Over the years, there have been discussions of constructing a multilane surface road from the I-84/Route 9 stack interchange to Route 218 to complete the northwest bypass of Hartford, but funding and potential impacts to the reservoirs that supply Hartford with much of its drinking water have prevented anything from being built north of I-84. The CTDOT headquarters was built on land originally acquired for I-291 where it would have intersected US 5/Route 15 in Newington. A small portion of what was to be the northwest leg of I-291 was built along Route 218 west of I-91, which is now used as a commuter parking lot.

Exit list
Exits are currently sequential but are planned to be converted to mileage-based exit numbering in 2025.

References

External links

kurumi.com I-291

91-2
91-2
2 (Connecticut)
Transportation in Hartford County, Connecticut